Charles Lee Tilden Jr., (June 4, 1894 – November 1, 1968) was an American rugby union player who competed in the 1920 Summer Olympics. In 1920 he won the gold medal as a member of the American rugby union team.

Four years later he was a reserve player in the American Olympic rugby union team but did not play.

He was a resident of Piedmont, California.

See also
Charles Lee Tilden (father)

References

External links
profile

1894 births
1968 deaths
American rugby union players
Rugby union players at the 1920 Summer Olympics
Rugby union players at the 1924 Summer Olympics
Olympic gold medalists for the United States in rugby
United States international rugby union players
Medalists at the 1920 Summer Olympics